Rona Munro (born 7 September 1959) is a Scottish writer. She has written plays for theatre, radio, and television. Her film work includes Ken Loach's Ladybird, Ladybird (1994), Oranges and Sunshine (2010) for Jim Loach and Aimée & Jaguar (1999), co-authored by German director Max Färberböck. Munro is the second cousin (once removed) of Scottish author Angus MacVicar.

She was famous for writing the last serial of the original Doctor Who in 1989, and then writing an episode for the tenth series of the revived Doctor Who in 2017, making her the only writer to work in both the classic and revival eras of Doctor Who.

Career 
Munro's work on Doctor Who was not limited to just Survival (1989) and "The Eaters of Light" (2016). She later novelised both stories for the original and revived range of Target Books, respectively.

Her history cycle The James Plays, James I, James II, and James III, were first performed by the National Theatre of Scotland in summer 2014 in a co-production with Edinburgh International Festival and the National Theatre UK. The plays were staged again in early 2016.  She followed this up with James IV - The Queen of the Fight in 2022. Her other credits include the theatre play Iron which has received many productions worldwide. Other theatre works include plays for the Traverse Theatre Edinburgh (Fugue, Your Turn To Clean The Stair, Strawberries in January translation), Manchester Royal Exchange (Mary Barton, Scuttlers), Plymouth Drum Theatre and Paines Plough (Long Time Dead), and the Royal Shakespeare Company (The Indian Boy, The Astronaut's Chair).

Munro has also contributed eleven dramas to Radio 4's Stanley Baxter Playhouse: First Impressions, Wheeling Them In, The King's Kilt, Pasta Alfreddo at Cafe Alessandro, The Man in the Garden, The Porter's Story, The German Pilot, The Spider, The Showman, Meg's Tale, and The Flying Scotsman.

In 2006 the Lyric Theatre, Hammersmith presented Munro's adaptation of Richard Adams' classic book Watership Down. Her early television work includes episodes of the drama series Casualty (BBC) and, more recently, a BBC film, Rehab, directed by Antonia Bird.

Rona Munro currently lives and works in Scotland. Her play The Last Witch was performed at the 2009 Edinburgh Festival, directed by Dominic Hill, and in 2011 by Dumbarton People's Theatre. In 2018, a production of her adaptation of My Name Is Lucy Barton starring Laura Linney opened in London.

Awards
 Giles Cooper Award for Dirt Under The Carpet, 1988
 Susan Smith Blackburn Prize, 1991
 Evening Standard Award, NOOK Award for Best Play for The James Plays, 2014
 Writers' Guild of Great Britain Award, Best Play for The James Plays, 2014

Works

Plays

 The Bang and the Whimper, 1982
 The Salesman, 1982
 Fugue, 1983
 Bus, 1984
 Touchwood, 1984
 Ghost Story, 1985
 Piper's Cave, 1985
 Watching Waiters, 1985
 Biggest Party in the World, 1986
 Dust And Dreams, 1986
 The Way To Go Home, 1987
 Winners, 1987
 Off The Road, 1988
 Long Story Short, 1989
 Saturday at the Commodore, 1989
 Bold Girls, 1990
 Scotland Matters, 1992
 Your Turn To Clean The Stair, 1992
 Haunted, 1999
 
 Snake, 1999
 
 Stick Granny on the Roofrack, 2002
 Gilt, 2003
 Catch A Falling Star!, 2004
 Women on the Verge of a T Junction, 2004
 Indian Boy, 2006
 Long Time Dead, 2006
 The Maiden Stone, 2006
 Mary Barton, 2006
 Strawberries in January, (translation) 2006
 Watership Down, 2006
 Dirt Under The Carpet, 2007
The Last Witch, 2009
 Little Eagles, 2011
The Astronaut's Chair, 2012
 Donny's Brain, 2012
 The James Plays, 2014
 Scuttlers, 2015
 Rebus: Long Shadows, 2018
My Name Is Lucy Barton, 2018
Mary Shelley's Frankenstein, 2019 
James IV - Queen of the Fight, based on the life of the courtier Ellen More for performance in 2022.

Screen
 Doctor Who, "Survival" (1989)
Casualty, Say It with Flowers (1990)
Ladybird, Ladybird (1994) 
Aimée & Jaguar (1999)
Oranges and Sunshine (2010)
 Doctor Who, "The Eaters of Light" (2017)

References

External links
 
Biography of Rona Munro at On Target
Interview
Rona Munro, doollee
Guardian interview preceding Edinburgh festival 2009.

1959 births
Living people
People from Aberdeen
Writers from Edinburgh
Scottish dramatists and playwrights
Scottish television writers
Scottish women dramatists and playwrights
British women screenwriters
British women television writers
20th-century Scottish dramatists and playwrights
21st-century Scottish dramatists and playwrights
20th-century Scottish women writers
21st-century Scottish writers
21st-century Scottish women writers
Scottish radio writers
Women radio writers